Yeshwant Balkrishna Joshi (1928 - 5 October 2012), also known as Yeshwantbuwa Joshi, was an Indian vocalist of Khayal-genre of Hindustani classical music.

Pandit Yeshwantbuwa Joshi was born at Pune, India.  He studied under Gwalior gharana with Pandit Mirashi Buwa and Jagannathbuwa Purohit.

His disciples include Ram Deshpande and Asha Khadilkar.

He was awarded Sangeet Natak Akademi Award in 2003, given by  the Sangeet Natak Akademi, India's National Academy of Music, Dance & Drama.

References 

1928 births
2012 deaths
Hindustani singers
Gwalior gharana
Recipients of the Sangeet Natak Akademi Award
20th-century Indian singers
Singers from Pune